Poha, also known as pauwa, sira, chira, aval (அவல்) or avalakki-in Kannada language (ಅವಲಕ್ಕಿ), among many other names, is flattened rice originating from the Indian subcontinent. Rice is parboiled before flattening so that it can be consumed with very little to no cooking. These flakes of rice swell when added to liquid, whether hot or cold, as they absorb water, milk or any other liquids. The thickness of the flakes varies from almost translucently thin (the more expensive varieties) to nearly four times thinner than a normal rice grain. 

This easily digestible form of raw rice is very popular across India, Nepal and Bangladesh, and is normally used to prepare snacks or light and easy fast food in a variety of Indian cuisine styles, some even for long-term consumption of a week or more. 

Flattened rice can be eaten raw by immersing it in plain water or milk, with salt and sugar to taste, or lightly fried in oil with nuts, raisins, cardamoms, and other spices. In Northern India Poha and Samosa is famous as breakfast. The lightly fried variety is a standard breakfast in the Malwa region (surrounding Ujjain and Indore) of Madhya Pradesh. It can be reconstituted with hot water to make a porridge or paste, depending on the proportion of water added. In villages, particularly in Chhattisgarh, flattened rice is also eaten raw by mixing with jaggery.  Indori poha from Indore is quite famous in the country and is eaten with a crispy snack called sev. It is also a very popular diet snack when mixed with peanuts, poha chana , wheat flakes etc.

In Maharashtra, flattened rice is cooked with lightly fried mustard seeds, turmeric, green chilli, finely chopped onions, and fried peanuts; moistened flattened rice is added to the spicy mix and steamed for a few minutes.

If the poha is too dry, sprinkle some water on it and mix well. You can also add peanuts or roasted chana dal for more crispiness.read more

Dishes made from beaten rice 

Samay baji(Newar) : Beaten rice is mixed with variety of delicacy including egg. fish. meat, potato, Choila (Newari dish), beans, fried garlic and ginger, Bara. It is one of the main dishes eaten in various special occasion. 
Aval Payasam (அவல் பாயாசம்) (Tamil Nadu): Beaten rice lightly roasted in ghee, cooked in milk and green gram, sweetened with jaggery or sugar, then tempered with cashews and dried grapes fired in ghee. This is served as a dessert during special occasions such as festivals, marriages etc.
Aval Upma (அவல் உப்மா) (Tamil Nadu): Beaten rice slightly roasted in ghee, cooked in water tempered with bengal gram, broken black gram, mustard seeds, curry leaves, coriander leaves, chopped ginger, red peppers, and salt in ghee. This is usually prepared as an option for breakfast or evening snacks.
Avil Nanachathu (അവൽ നനച്ചത്) also called Aval Kuthirthathu (അവൽ കുതിർത്തത്) (Kerala):  Beaten rice is mixed with milk, sugar, ground coconut and banana pieces. Peanuts or cashews may be used.
Avil Vilayichathu (അവൽ വിളയിച്ചത്) (Kerala): Beaten fried in ghee and mixed with jaggery, dal, cashews, peanuts and ground coconut.
Dahi Churaa (Bihari, Nepali): Beaten rice mixed with ripe banana, yogurt, and sugar. Although an "anytime" snack, it is also traditionally eaten by farmers during the rice planting season in Nepal.
Dhau Baji (Newar): Beaten rice is dry roasted in a pan, then mixed with yogurt and sugar.
Chindé'r pulao: A snack prepared by immersing the rice flakes in cold water, drying them, and then prepared pilaf-style with nuts, raisins, black pepper, green chillies, and salt and sugar to taste. This is very popular as a breakfast or evening dish in families, and may not be available in any stores or restaurants.
Chindé bheja: Flakes are immersed in a bowl of water and flavoured with lime juice, salt, sugar, and black pepper.
Chira Bhaja (চিড়া ভাজা - Bengali/Bangla): Beaten rice fried in oil, and salted with optionally added peanuts, chili powder and black salt (काला नमक-Hindi, বিট লবণ- Bengali/Bangla). Eaten as a snack. 
Chuda kadali chakata (ଚୁଡା କଦଳୀ ଚକଟା- Odisha): Washed beaten rice is mixed with milk, mashed ripe bananas, grated coconut, sugar or jaggery. A traditional breakfast meal eaten by Odias.
Chuda Kadamba(ଚୁଡା କଦମ୍ବ - Odisha): Firstly after heating ghee in a pan, cashew, raisins are also fried with it. Beaten rice or chuda is ground along with adding cardamom, sugar, grated coconut, ghee, cashew & slight milk. Small balls/ladoo are made from the dough with ghee, after refrigerating it is consumed.
Bajeel Ogarne or Avalakki Oggrane (ಅವಲಕ್ಕಿ ಒಗ್ಗರಣೆ - Karnataka): Beaten rice is seasoned with curry leaves, mustard seeds, gram, peanuts, oil, and red chillies. Optional add-ins, like grated coconut, onion and cilanteo are also permissible. Served hot.
Gojju avalakki or Huli avalakki (Karnataka)
Beaten rice with curds: Beaten rice is soaked in water and then sieved. Curd is added with table salt, and eaten with mango or lemon pickle.Kanda Pohe (कांदे पोहे) : Small pieces of boiled potato, onion, mustard seeds, turmeric and red chili are seasoned and mixed with soaked and sieved beaten rice, and served hot. It is also served with Tarri (chickpea and tomato curry) and seasoned with Chivda, known as Tarri Poha.Dadpe Pohe (दडपे पोहे): Thin or medium-sized beaten rice is mixed with fresh coconut, grated green mangoes, chilli powder, and coriander. Then it is seasoned with salt and a fried mixture of peanut oil, mustard seeds, turmeric, and finely chopped onions. Instead of raw mango, lemon can be used.Dahi Chuda: Beaten rice is cleaned with water to make it slightly soft, then yogurt and jaggery (sometimes sugar also) is added. This way of eating flattened rice is popular in Bihar and Assam and it is eaten as the first meal during festival of Magh Bihu in Assam and Makar Sankranti.Egg Pulau (Nepali): Spicy omelette preparation is whisked with raw and dry flattened rice and cooked in a pan in a similar way to an omelette. The almost-cooked egg pulau is mashed and left to cook, covered, until it turns red in colour.Poha Jalebi: This is the most famous breakfast across the Malwa region of Madhya Pradesh especially in Sagar, Indore, Ujjain, Ratlam, Mandsaur, Bhopal, Narmadapuram.Kharbujache Pohe: Beaten rice with muskmelon.Ful (egg) Chiura (Nepali): Common in Kathmandu households, flattened rice is fried in oil in a deep pan and salt is added. When the flattened rice turns golden/red, an egg is poached on top of it and covered with the rice until it has cooked.Teekh (spicy)  with coconut and hing (Konkani): This is made with beaten rice by adding a blended mixture of coconut flakes, hing (asafoetida), salt, green chillies and sugar to the softened  with 2 teaspoons of coconut oil.

 In popular culture 
In the Marathi movie Sanai Choughade, there is a song called 'Kande Pohe' about kande pohe''.

See also 
 Rolled oats
 Ambok, a similar dish from Cambodia eaten during the Og Ambok ceremony of the Cambodian Water Festival
 Pinipig, a similar dish from the Philippines that uses green glutinous rice grains
 Cốm, a similar dish from Vietnam that uses green rice grains
 Poha recipe in Hindi- स्वदिष्ट और पौष्टिक जल्दी बनालो

References 

Rice dishes
Indian rice dishes
Indian snack foods
Maharashtrian cuisine
Newari cuisine